The Main Ingredient is an American soul and R&B group.

The Main Ingredient may also refer to:

 The Main Ingredient (Pete Rock & CL Smooth album), 1994
 The Main Ingredient (Shirley Horn album), 1995